Sir Winston Churchill Secondary School may refer to the following:
Sir Winston Churchill Secondary School (Vancouver), in British Columbia, Canada
Sir Winston Churchill Secondary School (Hamilton, Ontario), in Ontario, Canada
Sir Winston Churchill Secondary School (St. Catharines), in Ontario, Canada

See also
Winston Churchill High School (disambiguation)